Rogača may refer to:

Rogača (Lučani), Serbia
Rogača (Sopot), Serbia